The Tüp ( Tüp,  Tyup) is a river in Tüp District and Ak-Suu District of Issyk-Kul Region of Kyrgyzstan. It rises on north slopes of Teskey Ala-Too Range, takes in several tributaries from the Kungey Alatau and flows into lake Issyk-Kul. With its length of  the Tüp is the longest river of the Issyk-Kul basin.

References

Rivers of Kyrgyzstan
Tributaries of Issyk-Kul